Anyang railway station is a station on the Beijing–Guangzhou railway in Anyang, Henan. It is the northernmost station operated by CR Zhengzhou on Beijing–Guangzhou railway.

History
The station was opened in 1904.

References

Railway stations in Henan
Stations on the Beijing–Guangzhou Railway
Railway stations in China opened in 1904